Anna Seniuk (born 17 November 1942, in Stanisławów) is a Polish actress.

After World War II, together with other Poles from Stanisławów, she was forced by the Soviet government to leave her hometown, settling in the town of Zator, near Oświęcim. In 1964 Seniuk graduated from Państwowa Wyższa Szkoła Teatralna (Academy for the Dramatic Arts) in Kraków and debuted in the renowned Helena Modrzejewska (Old Theatre). In the early 1970s, she moved to Warsaw, where she played in several theatres. Since 2003, she has been working there at the National Theatre.

Seniuk is known to Polish viewers mainly for her role of Magda Karwowska in the immensely popular 1970s Polish TV series Czterdziestolatek (The Forty-Year-Old). She has cooperated with Polish Radio and has been featured in more than 40 radio shows. Among her most famous film roles, there are appearances in such productions as Europa Europa, Potop and The Maids of Wilko.

Selected filmography

References
  Renata Sas, Anna Seniuk. Blisko życia i marzeń, Express Ilustrowany, 16 March 2002

External links

Seniuk’s filmography

1942 births
Living people
Actors from Ivano-Frankivsk
20th-century Polish actresses
Polish stage actresses
Polish film actresses
Polish television actresses
Commanders of the Order of Polonia Restituta
Recipients of the Gold Cross of Merit (Poland)
Recipients of the Gold Medal for Merit to Culture – Gloria Artis
Recipient of the Meritorious Activist of Culture badge